serves as the Deputy National Commissioner of the Scout Association of Japan. She also serves as the 2nd Vice-Chairman of the Asia-Pacific Regional Scout Committee from 2012 to 2018.

Suzuki also serves as a Board Member of the Olave Baden-Powell Society Board of Directors, and is a Life Member of the Kandersteg International Scout Centre.

She is married to Toby Suzuki, a former member of the World Scout Committee from 1999 to 2005 and a former member of the Asia-Pacific Scout Committee, and lives in Yokohama, Japan.

In 2013, Suzuki was awarded the Rupaula Katush award by the Nepal Scouts. In 2017, she was awarded the 354th Bronze Wolf, the only distinction of the World Organization of the Scout Movement, awarded by the World Scout Committee for exceptional services to world Scouting.

References

Yokohama Group 87
Nepal Scouts 2nd National Jamboree part 1 
APRInbox 2016
Friendship Programme KSA-SAJ

External links

 Scouting in Asia-Pacific NewsInfo August 2017 issue

Scouting in Japan
Living people
Year of birth missing (living people)
Recipients of the Bronze Wolf Award